Nettlesworth is a small village in County Durham, in England. It is situated to the south of Chester-le-Street, near Sacriston. Nettlesworth is adjoined with an old mining village called Kimblesworth. Nettlesworth has a school, Nettlesworth Primary School, and was home to a recently closed pub, the Black Bull.

External links

Villages in County Durham